Bulawayo City F.C. is a Zimbabwean football club based in Bulawayo, formed in 2006. They were champions of the Southern Region Division One in 2015 and in 2019. Their home shirt colors are red shirts with white edges, white shorts and red socks.

Current squad
Updated as of 7 April 2022.

References

Football clubs in Zimbabwe